Hidden Valley Highlands Ski Area is a ski and snowboard resort in Huntsville, Ontario, Canada. the resort features 15 groomed trails, three quad chairlifts, one handle tow, two snow cats, night skiing and snowboarding, and a terrain park. The Muskoka Ski Club was established in 1971 as the Hidden Valley Highlands Ski Club. The name was changed in 2008. As of 2010, the ski area has 692 individual members from 192 family units.

Facts
 Average snowfall: 343 cm (125 inches)
 Season: Late November–Mid March
 Lifts: 3 Quad Chairs, 1 Handle Tow
 Snowmaking: 80%
 Uphill capacity: 6500 persons per hour
 Longest run: 580 meters (1902 feet)
 Vertical: 100 meters (333 feet)
 Night skiing: Yes
 Terrain park: Yes
 Ski-able acres: 35 acres (14 hectares)
 Summit elevation: 389 meters (1276 feet)
 Base elevation: 289 meters (949 feet) 
 Cafeteria: Yes

Surrounding resorts and hotels
Hidden Valley Resort
Delta Grandview Resort
Holiday Inn (under construction)
King William Inn

See also
 List of ski areas and resorts in Canada

References

Hotel and leisure companies of Canada
Tourist attractions in the District Municipality of Muskoka
Huntsville, Ontario
1971 establishments in Ontario